Terry Williams (born April 8, 1996) is a professional Canadian football wide receiver and kick returner for the BC Lions of the Canadian Football League (CFL).

College career

Itawamba Community College
Williams first played college football for the Itawamba Community College Indians from 2016 to 2017. In 2017, he recorded 1,095 receiving yards and became the program's all-time leading receiver.

Tennessee-Martin
On December 20, 2017, it was announced that Williams had signed a National Letter of Intent to play for the UT Martin Skyhawks in 2018. He played in 23 games in two seasons for the program where he had 125 catches for 1,317 yards and six touchdowns. He also had 40 punt returns for 608 yards and two touchdowns.

Professional career

Ottawa Redblacks
On January 18, 2021, it was announced that Williams had signed with the Ottawa Redblacks. He was released following training camp on July 29, 2021, but re-signed with the team on September 12, 2021, and was placed on the practice roster. He later played in his first professional game on October 23, 2021, against the Hamilton Tiger-Cats, where he had seven punt returns for 62 yards and four kickoff returns for 66 yards. He played in two regular season games before returning to the practice roster. He re-signed with the team for the 2022 season on November 20, 2021.

In 2022, Williams opened the season as the team's primary punt and kick returner and played in the first nine games where he led the league with 36 kickoff returns for 914 yards and also had 31 punt returns for 306 yards. Following the signing of DeVonte Dedmon, Williams was placed on the injured list on August 26, 2022, as a healthy scratch.

BC Lions
On September 4, 2022, it was announced that Williams had been traded to the BC Lions in exchange for a third-round selection in the 2023 CFL Draft and a conditional selection in the 2024 CFL Draft.

Personal life
Williams was born to parents Angular Williams and Torris Robinson. He has four siblings, Tia, Tamare, Montez, and Lashanda.

References

External links
BC Lions bio 

1996 births
Living people
American football wide receivers
BC Lions players
Canadian football wide receivers
Itawamba Indians football players
Ottawa Redblacks players
People from Greenwood, Mississippi
Players of American football from Mississippi
Players of Canadian football from Mississippi
UT Martin Skyhawks football players